The Giornale del Popolo was a Swiss daily newspaper published in the Italian language and based in Lugano, Switzerland.

History and profile
The Giornale del Popolo was founded in 1926. After 92 years of history, its publication ceased in 2018 due to the decline of newspapers and a downturn in ad revenue.

As of 2018 the newspaper had an estimated audience of more than 35,000 daily readers.

See also
 List of newspapers in Switzerland

External links
 Archive on Sistema bibliotecario ticinese

References

1927 establishments in Switzerland
Publications established in 1927
Daily newspapers published in Switzerland
Italian-language newspapers published in Switzerland
Mass media in Lugano